Ek Var Piyu Ne Malva Aavje is a 2006 Gujarati romantic action film produced by Gunvant Thakor, Ramesh Patel, directed by Harsukh Patel, starring Hiten Kumar, Vikram Thakor, Firoz Irani, Minaxi, Mamata Soni, Jayendra Maheta, Jaimini Trivedi and Mayur Vankani in the lead roles, released in 2006.

Plot 
Vikram (Vikram Thakor), a stage performer, loved Radha (Mamta Soni), a daughter of rich Vajesang Thakor. Vajesang disapproved their marriage due to poor financial condition of Vikram. Suraj (Hiten Kumar), brother of Vikram, gives in and help Vikram to marry Radha.

Cast
 Hiten Kumar as Suraj
 Vikram Thakor as Vikram
 Firoz Irani as Roopsinh
 Minaxi as Tejal
 Mamta Soni as Radha
 Jayendra Maheta as Vajesang Thakor
 Jaimini Trivedi as Kadavi Foi
 Bhaskar Nayak as Mangalsinh
 Mayur Vankani as Popat

Reception
The film was debut of Vikram Thakor which was commercially successful. The film completed 25 weeks.

Soundtrack 

The music of the film is by Appu and all the songs were composed and written by Gunvant Thakor. The music album was released by Jay Shree Mahaveer Audio.

References

External links

2006 films
Films shot in Gujarat
Films set in Gujarat
2000s Gujarati-language films